The Pacific Interstate League was a minor league baseball league that played in the 1891 season. The four–team Independent level league consisted of teams based in Oregon and Washington. The Pacific Interstate League permanently folded following the 1891 season, later succeeded by the Inland Empire League, featuring the same four franchises.

History
The four host cities first formed together as the Pacific Interstate League of 1891. The Independent level league comprised the Baker Bunch Grassers, La Grande Grand Rhonders, Pendleton Ho Hos and Walla Walla Walla Wallas. 

On June 6, 1891, the Pacific Interstate League began league play .The La Grande Grand Rhonders won the championship with a 20–10 record, finishing 2.0 games ahead of the next team in the final standings. La Grande was followed by the 2nd place Pendleton Giants/Ho Hos (18–12), 3rd place Walla Walla Walla Wallas (16–14) and 4th place Baker Bunch Grassers (6–24) in the final Pacific Interstate League standings. Ending the season schedule on September 14, 1891, the league did not return to play in 1892 and permanently folded.

Eleven years after the Pacific Interstate League folded as a minor league, the same four cities reformed as the 1902 Inland Empire League, a Class D level league. The Baker City Gold Diggers, La Grande Beetpullers, Pendleton Indians and Walla Walla Sharpshooters were the 1902 members.

Pacific Interstate League teams

League standings

1891 Pacific Interstate League

References

Defunct minor baseball leagues in the United States
Baseball leagues in Washington (state)
Baseball leagues in Oregon
Defunct professional sports leagues in the United States
Sports leagues established in 1891
Sports leagues disestablished in 1891